State Route 235 (SR 235) is a  route that serves as a connection between U.S. Route 231/U.S. Route 280/State Route 76 (US 231/US 280/SR 76) at Childersburg with Talladega County Roads 190 and 191 (CR 190/CR 191) at Grasmere.

Route description
The southern terminus of SR 235 is located at its intersection with US 231/US 280/SR 76 at Childersburg. From the terminus, it takes a northerly route through the Alabama Army Ammunition Plant to its northern terminus at its intersection with Talladega County Road 190 (CR 190) at Grasmere where it continues as CR 191 to its terminus at CR 58/203 just west of Talladega.

Major intersections

References

235
Transportation in Talladega County, Alabama